Crystal Rain (2006) is the debut novel of Caribbean writer Tobias S. Buckell. Buckell calls it his "Caribbean steampunk novel". Although Crystal Rain is a stand-alone novel, Buckell's books Ragamuffin (2007) and Sly Mongoose (2008) are set in the same universe with some recurring characters.

The novel is set on Nanagadahoodababa, a planet far from Earth.

References

External links 
 Crystal Rain at Tobias Buckell website.

2006 American novels
2006 science fiction novels
Novels by Tobias S. Buckell
American science fiction novels
Debut science fiction novels
Caribbean in fiction
American steampunk novels
Tor Books books
2006 debut novels